Mutisianthol is a sesquiterpene compound found in Mutisia homoeantha. It was first isolated by Bohlmann et al. in 1979.

References 

Terpeno-phenolic compounds
Sesquiterpenes
Indanes